The third cabinet of Lascăr Catargiu was the government of Romania from 29 March to 3 November 1889.

Ministers
The ministers of the cabinet were as follows:

President of the Council of Ministers:
Lascăr Catargiu (29 March - 3 November 1889)
Minister of the Interior: 
Lascăr Catargiu (29 March - 3 November 1889)
Minister of Foreign Affairs: 
Alexandru N. Lahovari (29 March - 3 November 1889)
Minister of Finance:
George Vernescu (29 March - 3 November 1889)
Minister of Justice:
Nicolae Gherassi (29 March - 3 November 1889)
Minister of War:
Gen. George Manu (29 March - 3 November 1889)
Minister of Religious Affairs and Public Instruction:
Constantin Boerescu (29 March - 3 November 1889)
Minister of Public Works:
(interim) Alexandru N. Lahovari (29 March - 3 November 1889)
Minister of Agriculture, Industry, Commerce, and Property:
Grigore Păucescu (29 March - 3 November 1889)

References

Cabinets of Romania
Cabinets established in 1889
Cabinets disestablished in 1889
1889 establishments in Romania
1889 disestablishments in Romania